Brendon and Countisbury is an English civil parish in the district of North Devon and the county of Devon.

The civil parish was created on 26 October 2012, by the merger of the previous civil parishes of Brendon and Countisbury.

References

External links 

Civil parishes in Devon